Isaac Pallache (1593–1650) was born in 1593, possibly in Fez, Morocco, son of Joseph Pallache and nephew of Samuel Pallache. He came from the Sephardic Pallache family.

Career

Pallache studied at the University of Leiden, where he registered February 21, 1629.

With his brother Abraham, he served as an agent from the Netherlands to Morocco on his father's behalf.

Personal and death
Pallache converted to Christianity before 1629.

Little is known about his death.

See also

 Sephardic Jews in the Netherlands
 History of the Jews in the Netherlands
 History of the Jews in Morocco
 Morocco–Netherlands relations
 Pallache family
 Pallache (surname)
 Samuel Pallache
 Joseph Pallache
 David Pallache
 Moses Pallache
 Juda Lion Palache
 Charles Palache

References

Moroccan businesspeople
Dutch Sephardi Jews
Dutch Protestants
Converts to Protestantism from Judaism
16th-century Moroccan Jews
Moroccan Christians
1593 births
1650 deaths
Moroccan diplomats
People from Fez, Morocco
Businesspeople from Amsterdam
17th-century Moroccan Jews
16th-century Dutch botanists
Moroccan emigrants to the Netherlands